Arja Enni Helena Saijonmaa (born 1 December 1944 in Mikkeli) is a Finnish singer, political activist and occasional actress.

Life and career
She studied at the Sibelius Academy and earned a Bachelor of Arts at the Helsinki University. She made her breakthrough as a singer in Sweden. She has made albums with Swedish translations of songs by Mikis Theodorakis, as well as covers of Zarah Leander songs.

In 1978 she issued Miten voi kyllin kiittää, an album of Finnish translations of the songs of the Chilean composer and singer Violeta Parra. A Swedish version, Jag vill tacka livet, came out the following year. The title song, "Jag vill tacka livet" ("Gracias a la vida") was one of her greatest hits. Swedish prime minister Olof Palme had been a close friend, and his widow wanted Arja to sing at the funeral in 1986. She sang Enai Megalos O Kaimos in Swedish. In 1987, she participated at Melodifestivalen with the song "Högt över havet", ending up second. The same year, she scored a Svensktoppen hit with the song Jag vill leva i Europa.

As a politician, she has been a member of the Swedish People's Party in Finland, and in 1987 she was appointed UNHCR Goodwill Ambassador. She has written a Norwegian-language book, Sauna, about the Finnish sauna tradition.

She appeared in the first season of Let's Dance, the Swedish version of Strictly Come Dancing in 2006. Her professional partner was Tobias Karlsson, aged 28, and they were eliminated in the 7th week. In December 2007, Saijonmaa participated in the Swedish reality show Stjärnorna på slottet along with Peter Stormare, Britt Ekland, Jan Malmsjö and Magnus Härenstam.

She participated in Melodifestivalen 2019 with the song "Mina fyra årstider".

Saijonmaa is both Finnish and Swedish voice actor of Emma the Stage Rat in the Finnish-British animated television family drama Moominvalley (2019–).

Discography
Finnish language

1972: Laula kanssani toveri
1972: Arja Saijonmaa & Mikis Theodorakis
1973: Koko yön minun poikani valvoi
1975: Huomenta sydämeni
1979: Jokainen arkiaamu - Arja Saijonmaa & Mikis Theodorakis Ateenassa
1979: Miten voin kyllin kiittää
1981: Ruotsiin ja takaisin
1983: Ystävän laulu
1985: La Cumparsita
1988: Arja Saijonmaa & George de Godzinsky Finlandia-talossa
1989: Yhteinen taivas ja maa
1993: Paijaa mua
2000: Sydänten silta
2006: Rakkaus on rohkeutta

Reissues

1985: Valitut laulut
1988: Arja Saijonmaa (2LP)
1995: 20 Suosikkia: Ystävän laulu: 
2001: 20 Suosikkia: Satumaa
2007: Tähtisarja - 30 suosikkia (2CD)

Swedish language

1977: Det är tid att sjunga sånger
1977: Tango Jalousie
1978: Arja Saijonmaa i Stockhomns konserthus
1979: Jag vill tacka livet
1981: Sånger från asfalt och ängar
1982: Leksar och parfym
1987: Högt över havet
1988: Arja sjunger Zarah
1989: Samma himmel, samma sol
1994: La Cumparsita
1998: Bara du kommer
1999: En bro av gemenskap
2003: Arja Nära

Reissues

1994: Arja's bästa
2000: Guldkorn
2002: 100% (2CD)
2005: Vad du än trodde så trodde du fel

Other languages

1976: Bonjour mon coeur
1983: Es ist Zeit

Films
Arja Saijonmaa has appeared in the following films:

1969: Punatukka
1969: Pohjan tähteet
1979: Herr Puntila and His Servant Matti

Bibliography
Swedish language
Sauna,  (bound) Malmö, Sweden : Richters förlag, 2000 Swedish 271 pages.
En ung naken kvinna : mötet med Mikis (A young naked woman - the meeting with Mikis),  (bound) Stockholm, Sweden : Piratförlaget, 2011 Swedish 443 pages, [16] picture pages + 1 CD with four songs by Mikis Theodorakis

References

Sources

Tony Latva and Petri Tuunainen, Iskelmän tähtitaivas, WSOY 2004, 
M.A. Numminen, Tango on intohimoni, Schilds 1998,

External links

 Official website (warning: background music)
 Short bio on United Nations' website

1944 births
Living people
People from Mikkeli
United Nations High Commissioner for Refugees Goodwill Ambassadors
Sibelius Academy alumni
Swedish-speaking Finns
Swedish-language singers
Finnish expatriates in Sweden
Finnish expatriates in France
Participants in Swedish reality television series
20th-century Finnish women singers
21st-century Finnish women singers
Melodifestivalen contestants of 2019
Melodifestivalen contestants of 2005
Melodifestivalen contestants of 1987